Nick Slade may refer to:

Nick Slade, character in Silk (TV series)
Nick Slade, character in Mr. Monk and the Dirty Cop